The Thirty-first Oklahoma Legislature was a meeting of the legislative branch of the government of Oklahoma, composed of the Senate and the House of Representatives. It met in Oklahoma City from January 7, 1967, to January 7, 1969, during the term of Governor Dewey Bartlett. This was the first Oklahoma state legislature that met under new requirements approved by voters in 1966 that the legislature hold annual, 90-day legislative sessions.

Clem McSpadden served as the President pro tempore of the Oklahoma Senate and Rex Privett served as the Speaker of the Oklahoma House of Representatives.

Dates of sessions
First regular session: January 7-May 11, 1967
Second regular session: January 6-May 5, 1968
Previous: 30th Legislature • Next: 32nd Legislature

Party composition

Senate

House of Representatives

Leadership
President of the Senate: Lieutenant Governor George Nigh
President Pro Tem of the Senate: Clem McSpadden
Speaker of the House: Rex Privett
Speaker Pro Tempore: Joseph Mountford
Majority Floor Leader: Leland Wolf
Minority Leader of the House: James W. Connor

Staff
Louise Stockton

Members

Senate

Table based on 2005 Oklahoma Almanac.

House of Representatives

Table based on database of historic members.

References

Oklahoma legislative sessions
1967 in Oklahoma
1968 in Oklahoma
1967 U.S. legislative sessions
1968 U.S. legislative sessions